Undercover Boss Australia is the Australian incarnation of the Undercover Boss franchise. The first series features 6 episodes and premiered on Network Ten on 18 October 2010. A second series consisting of 8 episodes began airing on 12 September 2011.

Series overview

Episodes

Series 1: 2010

Series 2: 2011

Ratings

Series 1: 2010

Series 2: 2011

Metro Cities - Sydney, Brisbane, Melbourne, Adelaide and Perth

References

Episodes (Australia)
Lists of reality television series episodes